Giovanni Di Cristo (born 1 August 1986 in Torre del Greco) is an Italian judoka.

At just six years old he started to practice judo at his local gym, in Torre del Greco near Naples. His first important successes came in the Minors category in 2001  and Cadets, when he won the Italian title in the 66 kg in 2002. He became known in the juvenile nationals and showed he was a leading athlete on the Italian judo scene, gaining two bronze medals in the junior championships of 2004 and 2005. In the same year he won the Italian junior/senior cup in Ostia. The year 2007 is the year that saw his definitive consecration in the international judo scene, winning the bronze medal in the Italian Under-23 championships, and then going on to become the Italian national champion in Monza and finally winning the gold medal in the European Under-23 Championships on 24 November 2007, in Salzburg (Aut), after crushing the competition of the other European competitors. The athlete, a new acquisition of the Guardia di Finanza, reconfirmed his high-level status in the Italian Championships in Genoa on 26 April 2008, winning 7 encounters and beating Marco Maddaloni in the final match, who had been absent in 2007.

Achievements

References

External links
 

1986 births
Living people
Italian male judoka
Sportspeople from the Province of Naples
People from Torre del Greco
Mediterranean Games gold medalists for Italy
Mediterranean Games medalists in judo
Competitors at the 2009 Mediterranean Games